Simone Perrotta  (born 17 September 1977) is an Italian former professional footballer who played as a midfielder. Throughout his career, he stood out for his work-rate, energy, and box-to-box play as a ball-winner in the midfield area. After initially playing for Italian sides Reggina, Juventus, Bari, and Chievo, Perrotta went on to spend most of his career with Serie A club Roma, until his retirement on 29 June 2013; he won consecutive Coppa Italia titles with the club in 2007 and 2008, as well as the 2007 Supercoppa Italiana.

Born in England, at international level, Perrotta represented the Italy national team on 48 occasions between 2002 and 2009. He was a member of the team that won the 2006 FIFA World Cup and also represented Italy in two UEFA European Championships.

Club career

Early career: Reggina and Juventus
Perrotta was born in Ashton-under-Lyne, England, in the same hospital as England's 1966 World Cup winner Geoff Hurst. He grew up in the youth system of Reggina and debuted in Serie B in 1995, becoming an important fixture in their line-up. In 1998, Juventus decided to sign him; however, due to the presence of several more experienced and world-class midfielders ahead of him on the team, such as Antonio Conte, Didier Deschamps, Edgar Davids, Alessio Tacchinardi, and Zinedine Zidane, he struggled to gain playing time, and only made five league appearances for the Turin club, and 15 in total. Despite his limited space at the club, he was able to score a goal in the Coppa Italia, make his Champions League debut, and appeared in the 1999 UEFA Intertoto Cup, which Juventus went on to win, before being sent out on loan to Bari.

Bari
In 1999, Perrotta was farmed to Bari in a co-ownership deal for 3 billion Italian lire (or €1,549,371), as part of Gianluca Zambrotta's deal, where he played for two seasons, breaking into the first team. In June 2001, Bari acquired him outright for approximately €300,000, making Juventus booked a financial cost of €1.25 million for the discount.

Chievo
At the start of 2001–02 Serie A, following Bari's relegation from the Serie A, he was shipped to Chievo, where he remained for three seasons, and made a name for himself as one of Italy's best midfielders. Alongside Eugenio Corini, he was a mainstay in the midfield of a surprising newly promoted Chievo squad that was first place at the winter break, and finished the season in fifth place under manager Luigi Delneri, qualifying for the UEFA Cup. He even provided the winning assist in their famous victory over Internazionale that season. Despite his consistent performances, his next two seasons at the club were less successful, due to the departure of several key players, as Chievo finished seventh in Serie A during the 2002–03 season, and ninth in Serie A during the 2003–04 season.

Roma
In 2004, Roma signed him from the Veneto club for €7.2 million on a four-year instalment. The deal was later changed to three instalments, however; new Roma signing Matteo Brighi, valued at €16 million was loaned to Chievo for the season as part of the deal. and then discounted to €7.05 million, His first season at the club saw him play in a supporting role as a defensive midfielder, behind the attacking trio made up of Francesco Totti, Antonio Cassano, and Vincenzo Montella; however, the season was largely unsuccessful, as Roma underwent several managerial changes, suffered a first round elimination in the UEFA Champions League, finished eighth in Serie A, and lost out to Inter in the 2005 Coppa Italia Final.

The following season saw the arrival of Luciano Spalletti as Roma's new head coach. Under Spalletti's 4–2–3–1 formation, Perrotta played in a more advanced role, behind the first striker and in between the left and right winger as an attacking central midfielder, in which he was able to rediscover his form, becoming a key member of Roma's midfield, as Roma reached the 2006 Coppa Italia Final. In merit of his fine performances for the capital club, he earned a call-up to Marcello Lippi's Italy squad for the 2006 FIFA World Cup, starting all seven games for the eventual champions. In 2006, he also signed a contract extension with the capital club, keeping him in Rome until 2010.

Perrotta continued to excel in this more advanced role under Spalletti, and scored 13 goals in all competitions during the 2006–07 season, as he won the Coppa Italia title in 2007, finishing as the tournament's top scorer; the following season, he helped Roma to defend title, and also won the 2007 Supercoppa Italiana, in which he was sent off.

Perrotta signed a new one-year extension to his contract with Roma in October 2009, extending his stay at the club until 2011. In March 2011, he signed another contract, with basic salary decreased to €2.5 million per season.

For the 2011–12 season, Perrotta was usually used as a central midfielder alongside Daniele De Rossi and Miralem Pjanić. On 20 February 2012, Perrotta signed a new one-year extension to his contract with Roma that will keep him at the club until 2013. Perrotta's fixed gross fee for the current season was raised to €2.6 million plus performance bonuses. He played 20 matches in the 2011–12 season, failing to score a goal.

After almost two years without scoring, he scored against Siena on 2 December 2012, giving Roma a 1–2 lead away. Roma eventually won the game 1–3, with a brace from Mattia Destro. He scored again on 3 March 2013, also in a 3–1 win, against Genoa at the Stadio Olimpico. He was substituted on for striker Pablo Osvaldo in the 81st minute and eight minutes later, in the 89th minute, he scored a goal that sealed the match. After the appointment of Aurelio Andreazzoli as caretaking manager, he received significantly more playing time than under the Czech Zdeněk Zeman. He finished the season with 16 league appearances, only four as a starter, with two goals scored; under manager Aurelio Andreazzoli, he was left on the bench in Roma's 1–0 Coppa Italia Final defeat to cross-city rivals Lazio. On 29 June 2013, Perrotta announced his retirement from professional football.

International career
Perrotta was eligible to play for both Italy and England – the latter due to his birth in the country (in addition to being Italian, he is automatically a British citizen as the United Kingdom granted unconditional birthright citizenship until 1983). Perrotta made his debut for the Italy under-21 team under Marco Tardelli, making 6 appearances and scoring a goal. He won the 2000 UEFA European Under-21 Football Championship, appearing in Italy's 2–1 victory over the Czech Republic in the final, but was later dropped from the 2000 Summer Olympics squad due to injury. He made his senior international debut under Giovanni Trapattoni, on 20 November 2002, in a 1–1 draw against Turkey. He subsequently played for Italy at UEFA Euro 2004, scoring a goal in a 2–1 win against Bulgaria, although the Italy national side were eliminated in the first round of the tournament on direct-encounters following a three-way five point tie with Denmark and Sweden.

Perrotta also represented the Italy national team during the 2006 FIFA World Cup under coach Marcello Lippi, starting in all seven of the Azzurris games, including the final, en route to their fourth World Cup title, setting up Filippo Inzaghi's goal in a 2–0 win over the Czech Republic in Italy's final group match of the tournament on 22 June. Unlike with Roma, Perrotta was often used as a left winger with the Italy national team under Lippi, or as a "front-lying" defensive midfielder, as he was in the 2006 World Cup.

Under new manager Roberto Donadoni, Perrotta scored his second goal for Italy in a 3–1 away win over Georgia in a Euro 2008 qualifying match on 11 October 2006. He made his first appearance as Italy captain on 21 November 2007, in the second half of a 3–1 home win over the Faroe Islands, in a European qualifier. He went on to take part at UEFA Euro 2008, often appearing as an attacking midfielder, where Italy lost out to eventual champions Spain on penalties in the quarter-finals.

In 2009, after being left out from 2010 FIFA World Cup squad by Marcello Lippi, he retired from international football; he made his final appearance for Italy on 10 February 2009, in a 2–0 friendly defeat to Brazil, at the Emirates Stadium. In total he made 48 appearances for Italy, scoring two goals.

Style of play
A quick, physically strong, energetic, tenacious, and hard-working two-way player, Perrotta was known for his pace, versatility, and consistency, as well as his stamina, box-to-box play, and hard running style, which allowed him to play anywhere in midfield; although he was usually used in the centre, and often in a holding role in front of the defence, where he was adept at breaking down plays and subsequently distributing the ball to team-mates after winning back possession, throughout his career, he was also deployed out wide, as a mezzala, or even in a more advanced role, behind the strikers, due to his movement off the ball and ability to make attacking runs into the penalty box, as well as his eye for goal from midfield.

Personal life
Perrotta is of Calabrian origins and was born in England. He lived in England until the age of five, attending the former St Ann's RC Primary School on Burlington Street in Ashton-under-Lyne. His parents, Francesco and Anna Maria, ran a pub in Ashton and lived on Fitzroy Street and briefly at the Chiltern Chapel before moving back to Italy in 1982, to their hometown Cerisano, in the province of Cosenza. He is married and he has a son called Peter.

On 22 December 2010, a statue of Perrotta was unveiled in Ashton-under-Lyne, close to Curzon Ashton F.C.'s Tameside Stadium in the Roy Oldham Sports Village, Richmond Street. The triple sculpture by Andrew Edwards and Sculpture For Sport commemorates the three men from the borough of Tameside who hold World Cup winner's medals: Geoff Hurst, Jimmy Armfield, and Perrotta. He speaks English and Italian.

Career statistics
Club

International

Scores and results list Italy's goal tally first.

Honours

ClubRoma Coppa Italia: 2006–07, 2007–08
 Supercoppa Italiana: 2007

InternationalItaly'''
 FIFA World Cup: 2006
 UEFA Under-21 European Championship: 2000

Individual
 Coppa Italia Top scorer: 2006–07

Orders
  CONI: Golden Collar of Sports Merit: 2006

  4th Class / Officer: Ufficiale Ordine al Merito della Repubblica Italiana'': 2006

References

External links
 Profile on AS Roma's official website
 FootballDatabase.com provides Perrotta's profile and stats

Sportspeople from the Province of Cosenza
Footballers from Ashton-under-Lyne
English people of Italian descent
People of Calabrian descent
1977 births
Living people
Italian footballers
Italy international footballers
Italy under-21 international footballers
Association football midfielders
Reggina 1914 players
Juventus F.C. players
S.S.C. Bari players
A.C. ChievoVerona players
A.S. Roma players
UEFA Euro 2004 players
2006 FIFA World Cup players
UEFA Euro 2008 players
Serie A players
Serie B players
FIFA World Cup-winning players
Officers of the Order of Merit of the Italian Republic
Footballers from Calabria